Chal Boqa (also Romanized as Chāl Boqā; also known as Chābūgha, Chāl Boghā’, Chālbūgha, and Shālbaqā) is a village in Sardrud-e Sofla Rural District, Sardrud District, Razan County, Hamadan Province, Iran. At the 2006 census, its population was 278, in 57 families.

References 

Populated places in Razan County